Blue-light federalists was a term used by those who believed that certain Federalists had made friendly ("blue-light") signals to British ships during the War of 1812 to warn the British of American blockade runners supposedly in 1813 in New London, Connecticut. Then, Commodore Stephen Decatur saw blue lights burning near the mouth of the New London River in sight of the British blockaders. He was convinced that these were signals to betray his plans.

The Federalist Party had many members who pushed for peace with Britain, and some of its members opposed further prosecution of the war and were styled as the "blue light" faction by their enemies.

See also
Hartford Convention

References

Federalist Party
New London, Connecticut
War of 1812